Laurent Bernard (born June 15, 1971 in Chatenay-Malabry, France) is a French basketball player who played 9 times for the French men's national basketball team between 2000-2001.

References

French men's basketball players
1971 births
Living people
HTV Basket players
SIG Basket players
People from Châtenay-Malabry
Sportspeople from Hauts-de-Seine
20th-century French people